Richard Devere Thrasher (5 March 1922 – 11 October 1993) was a Progressive Conservative party member of the House of Commons of Canada. He was born in Amherstburg, Ontario and became a barrister and solicitor by career.

He was first elected at the Essex South riding in the 1957 general election and re-elected in the 1958 election during which time he served as Parliamentary Secretary to the Minister of Labour (1959–1961, and early 1962).

Thrasher was defeated by the Liberal party's Eugene Whelan in the 1962 election and was unsuccessful in unseating Whelan at Essex South in the 1963 and 1965 elections.

External links
 

1922 births
1993 deaths
Members of the House of Commons of Canada from Ontario
People from Amherstburg, Ontario
Progressive Conservative Party of Canada MPs